Mikael Åke Persbrandt (born 25 September 1963) is a Swedish actor. In Swedish films, he is perhaps best known for playing Gunvald Larsson in the Beck series of movies. He is internationally known for his starring role in the Academy Award-winning feature, In a Better World, directed by Susanne Bier. His performance earned him a 2011 European Film Award nomination for Best Actor. Other parts include the role of Carl Hamilton from the novels by Jan Guillou, Beorn in The Hobbit, as well as Jakob Nyman in the British TV series Sex Education.

Early life
Persbrandt was born in Jakobsberg, Järfälla Municipality, Stockholm County. He was baptized in the Finnish Church in Gamla stan. Persbrandt has stated that he has ancestry from Åland on his mother's side, and that he thinks his paternal ancestors were Walloons.

Career
He has performed onstage with the Royal Dramatic Theatre in Stockholm and in numerous film and TV roles. Persbrandt is well known for his role as the hardboiled police inspector Gunvald Larsson, in the Beck series of films. He won the Guldbagge Award for Best Actor in a leading role twice, the first in 2009 for Everlasting Moments and the second in 2014 for Nobody Owns Me. In 2015, Persbrandt reported that he would quit starring in his popular role of Gunvald Larsson. In 2019, Persbrandt began playing Jakob Nyman in the Netflix comedy drama Sex Education.
He was a leading actor in the film  The Salvation.

Public image and legal issues

Sex appeal
Persbrandt has often been noted for his good looks, and when Swedish media makes lists of the most attractive Swedish men, he has often been on those lists.

Expressen dispute 
In December 2005, Persbrandt notified police that the newspaper Expressen had made false accusations about him having acute alcohol poisoning and being admitted to a clinic in Uppsala. The information was inaccurate. Expressen apologised and admitted that their information was false, but the apology was not accepted by Persbrandt. Otto Sjöberg, at the time editor of the newspaper was fined 75,000 SEK (≈ 6800 €, US$8900), in damages to Persbrandt.

Drug use 
Persbrandt was arrested twice in 2011 for cocaine use and received a fine. In April 2014, he was sentenced to five months' imprisonment for another cocaine offence, but on appeal this was reduced to 75 hours' community service.

Personal life
He is in a relationship with Sanna Lundell and the couple have three children together. He had previously been married to Maria Bonnevie.

Theatre
All the performances are in Swedish.

Filmography

Discography

Albums

References

External links

Official home page 
Official fan-site

1963 births
Swedish male film actors
Male actors from Stockholm
Living people
Sommar (radio program) hosts
Best Actor Guldbagge Award winners
20th-century Swedish male actors
21st-century Swedish male actors
Swedish male stage actors
Swedish male voice actors
Swedish male television actors
People convicted of drug offenses
Swedish people of Finnish descent
Swedish people of Belgian descent